Neil Horwood (born 4 August 1964) is a footballer who played as a forward in the Football League for Tranmere Rovers.

References

1964 births
Living people
People from Peterhead
Association football forwards
Scottish footballers
King's Lynn F.C. players
Grimsby Town F.C. players
Halifax Town A.F.C. players
Tranmere Rovers F.C. players
Cambridge United F.C. players
Spalding United F.C. players
English Football League players
Footballers from Aberdeenshire